Andrei Avgustovich Ebergard (9 November 1856 – 19 April 1919), better known as Andrei Eberhardt, was an admiral in the Imperial Russian Navy of German ancestry.

Biography
Eberhardt was born in Patras, Greece, where his father, August Eberhardt, served as the Russian consul. He had Westphalian ancestry; his grandfather Johann Karl Eberhardt moved from Hamburg to Russia during the early-19th century. He was not baptised a Lutheran but an Orthodox because his mother was Russian.

Eberhardt graduated from the Russian Marine Cadet Corps in 1878. From 1882 to 1884 he served in the Siberian Military Flotilla as a signals officer. In 1886, he became a flag officer and adjutant to Admiral Ivan Shestakov (Minister of the Navy, in office: 1882-1888) and in 1891 he became a flag officer to Admiral  commanding the Russian Pacific Squadron. In 1896 Eberhardt transferred to the Black Sea Fleet, serving as gunnery officer on the battleships Ekaterina II and Chesma. In 1898 he moved back to the Russian Far East; he commanded the cruiser Admiral Nakhimov and took part in suppressing the Boxer Rebellion of 1899-1901 in China.

In 1905 he captained the battleship Imperator Aleksandr II and in 1906 became captain of the battleship Panteleimon. He was promoted to rear admiral in 1907 and to vice admiral in 1909.

Eberhardt served as Chief of the Russian Naval General Staff from 1908 and as Commander-in-Chief of the Black Sea Fleet from 1911. Following the outbreak of World War I in 1914, his top achievement was setting up a naval blockade of the Zonguldak coal fields from 1915 and thus choking the coal supply of the German-Turkish fleet. He also commanded the Russian battleship squadron during the Battle of Cape Sarych (near the Crimea) in November 1914. However, he showed reluctance to start further offensive actions against Ottoman positions in the Bosporus, and Aleksandr Kolchak succeeded him in June 1916.

Eberhardt retired from service in December 1917. The Cheka arrested him in 1918, but then released him. He died in 1919 and was buried in the Novodevichy Cemetery in Petrograd.

Honours and awards
 Order of St. Vladimir, 4th class with swords and bow (December 28, 1900), 3rd degree with swords, 2nd class with swords
 Gold Sword for Bravery
 Order of the White Eagle, with swords,
 Order of St. Alexander Nevsky with diamonds (for the Black Sea Fleet Command in 1914-1916.)
 Order of St. Stanislaus, 1st and 2nd classes
 Order of St. Anne, 1st and 2nd classes
 Order of St Michael and St George (United Kingdom)
 Order of the Rising Sun (Japan)
 Commander Grand Cross of the Order of the Sword (Sweden)
 Knight Grand Cross of the Legion of Honour, also awarded Commander and Chevalier (France)
 Commander of the Order of the Redeemer (Greece)

Notes

References
 Stephen McLaughlin, The Action off Cape Sarych, In Warship 2001-2002 Conways Maritime Press

External links

 Short biography

1856 births
1919 deaths
Imperial Russian Navy admirals
Recipients of the Order of St. Vladimir, 2nd class
Recipients of the Gold Sword for Bravery
Recipients of the Order of St. Anna, 1st class
Honorary Companions of the Order of St Michael and St George
Recipients of the Order of the Rising Sun
Recipients of the Order of the Sword
Grand Croix of the Légion d'honneur
Burials at Novodevichy Cemetery (Saint Petersburg)
Admirals of World War I
Recipients of the Order of the White Eagle (Poland)
Naval Cadet Corps alumni